The rufous-cheeked laughingthrush (Garrulax castanotis) is a species of bird in the family Leiothrichidae. It was formerly considered to be conspecific with the grey laughingthrush, G. maesi.  It is found in China, Laos, and Vietnam.  Its natural habitats are subtropical or tropical moist lowland forests and subtropical or tropical moist montane forests.

References

Garrulax
Birds described in 1899